Rasoul Raeisi (8 October 1924 – 23 July 2015) was an Iranian weightlifter who competed in the 1948 Summer Olympics. He died on 23 July 2015.

References

1924 births
2015 deaths
World Weightlifting Championships medalists
Iranian male weightlifters
Olympic weightlifters of Iran
Weightlifters at the 1948 Summer Olympics
Asian Games gold medalists for Iran
Weightlifters at the 1951 Asian Games
Medalists at the 1951 Asian Games
Asian Games medalists in weightlifting
20th-century Iranian people